The Sonnenberg Funicular, also known as the Standseilbahn Kriens–Sonnenberg (KSB) or Sonnenbergbahn, is a funicular railway near the city of Lucerne in the Swiss canton of Lucerne. It links the town of Kriens with the Sonnenberg at 704 m, a hiking and recreational area, and serves an intermediate stop at Zumhof.

The line was opened in 1902. In recent years it has been restored electrically and mechanically.

The funicular has the following parameters:

See also
List of heritage railways and funiculars in Switzerland

References

External links

Funicular railways in Switzerland
Transport in Lucerne
Metre gauge railways in Switzerland
Heritage railways in Switzerland